The Minister for Infrastructure, Transport, Regional Development and Local Government in the Government of Australia is a position currently held by Catherine King following the swearing in of the full Albanese ministry on 1 June 2022.

The Minister for Regional Development, Local Government and Territories is a position currently held by Kristy McBain.

Scope
In the Government of Australia,  the minister for infrastructure has overall responsibility for all of the matters falling within the Infrastructure, Transport, Regional Development and Communications portfolio, including regulation, safety and funding in relation to aviation, shipping, roads and railways and policy on regional development, local government and the territories, including the Australian Capital Territory and the Northern Territory.

History
Under the Constitution of Australia the federal government was not given any specific responsibilities for transport, except for "railway construction and extension in any State with the consent of that State" (section 51(xxxiv)). In 1916, Billy Hughes appointed Patrick Lynch as Minister for Works and Railways to administer Commonwealth Railways and the construction of the Trans-Australian Railway. In December 1928, Stanley Bruce appointed Thomas Paterson as Minister for Markets and Transport, which included responsibility for funding road construction via grants to the states. In January 1932, this portfolio was renamed Minister for Transport, but in April 1932 it was absorbed into the new portfolio of Minister for the Interior along with the position of Minister for Works and Railways.

In December 1938, with the growth of significance of civil aviation and the commonwealth's assumption of responsibility for regulating it under international treaties, Joseph Lyons appointed Harold Thorby as the first Minister for Civil Aviation. In 1941 Robert Menzies re-established the transport portfolio with the appointment of Hubert Lawrence Anthony. The Curtin government was determined to establish a government shipping company, ultimately the Australian National Lines, and John Curtin appointed Jack Beasley as Minister for Supply and Development in 1941. This position was renamed Minister for Shipping, Fuel and Transport in 1950 under the Menzies government and Minister for Shipping and Transport in 1951. Gough Whitlam combined the transport and civil aviation portfolios in 1973, but it was re-divided with Malcolm Fraser's appointment of Wal Fife as Minister for Aviation in 1982. Bob Hawke abolished the aviation portfolio in 1987 with the creation of the "super" departments. Since 1987, there has been a single senior transport minister in Cabinet.

Agency and bodies
Other agencies and bodies the portfolio include:
 Australian Transport Safety Bureau
 Airservices Australia
 Australian Bicycle Council
 Australian Global Navigation Satellite System Coordination Committee (AGCC)
 Australian Local Government and Planning Ministers' Council
 Australian Maritime College
 Australian Maritime Safety Authority
 Australian Motor Vehicle Certification Board
 Australian Rail Operations Unit
 Australian Rail Track Corporation
 Australian Transport Advisory Council
 Christmas Island Administration
 Civil Aviation Safety Authority
 Cocos (Keeling) Islands Administration
 East Kimberley Council of Australian Governments (COAG) Indigenous Trial
 International Air Services Commission
 Jervis Bay Territory Administration
 Local Government and Planning Joint Committee
 National Capital Authority
 National Transport Commission
 Navigation Safety Advisory Committee
 Administrator of the Northern Territory
 Office of the Administrator Norfolk Island
 Regional Development Council
 Regional Women's Advisory Council
 Standing Committee on Regional Development Secretariat
 Stevedoring Industry Finance Committee
 Tasmanian Freight Equalisation Scheme Review Authority

List of ministers for infrastructure, transport and regional development
The following individuals have been appointed as Minister for Infrastructure, Transport and Regional Development, or any precedent titles:

List of ministers for local government and regional services
The following individuals have been appointed Minister for Local Government, or any precedent titles:

List of ministers for territories
The following individuals have been appointed as Minister for Territories, or any precedent titles:

Notes
 Whitlam was one of a two-man ministry consisting of himself and Lance Barnard for two weeks until the full ministry was announced.

Former ministerial titles and portfolios

List of ministers for aviation
The following individuals have been appointed as Minister for Aviation, or any precedent titles:

List of ministers for shipping
The following individuals were appointed as Ministers for Shipping, or any precedent titles:

List of ministers for works and railways
The following individuals have been appointed as Minister for Works and Railways, or any precedent titles:

List of ministers for major projects, territories, and local government
The following individuals have been appointed as the Minister for Major Projects, Territories, and Local Government, or any other precedent titles:

Notes
 Whitlam was one of a two-man ministry consisting of himself and Lance Barnard for two weeks until the full ministry was announced.

List of ministers for regional development
The following individuals have been appointed Minister for Regional Development, or any precedent titles:

List of ministers for population, cities and urban infrastructure
The following individuals have served as the Minister for Population, Cities and Urban Infrastructure, or any other precedent titles:

List of outer ministry ministers
Since the creation of the enlarged portfolios in the third Hawke ministry on 24 July 1987 there has usually been a minister or assistant outside cabinet supporting the Minister for Transport and Infrastructure, or any precedent title.

References

External links
 

Infrastructure, Transport, Regional Development and Local Government
Urban development in Australia
Transport in Australia